Castellano may refer to:

 Castilian (disambiguation) (Spanish: castellano)
 Castile (historical region)
 Spanish language, or Castilian (Spanish: castellano)
Castilian Spanish 
 Castellano (surname), including a list of people with the name
 Castellano (grape), or Albillo, a Spanish wine grape
 Castellano, Trentino, a village in Italy
 Castellano (river), a river in Italy

See also

 Castellanos (disambiguation)
 Castellani (disambiguation)
 Carea Castellano Manchego, a dog breed native to Spain